Thomas Joseph White, O.P., (born 1971) is an American Roman Catholic priest and theologian. On September 14, 2021, he succeeded Michał Paluch, OP, as rector of the Pontifical University of Saint Thomas Aquinas in Rome (the “Angelicum”).

Biography 
White grew up in southeast Georgia in an inter-religious household. His father is a Jewish doctor and his mother a nurse. He was baptized by an Episcopal priest in his 20s, but quickly converted to Catholicism his senior year of college. He completed his bachelor’s in religious studies from Brown University (1993) and his Master’s (1995) and Doctorate (2002) in Theology at Oxford University.  He entered the Order of Preachers in 2003.  He completed his licentiate in Sacred Theology (2007) at the Dominican House of Studies in Washington, D.C. He professed final vows on May 17, 2007, and on May 23, 2008, was ordained a priest.

His research and teaching concentrate on Thomistic metaphysics, Christology and Roman Catholic-Reformed ecumenical dialogue.  He was appointed an ordinary member of the Pontifical Academy of St. Thomas Aquinas in 2011.  White taught at the Dominican House of Studies in Washington, D.C from 2008-2018, and was the founder and Director of the Washington DC Thomistic Institute from 2009 until his departure for Rome in 2018.

In 2015 White became  co-editor of Nova et Vetera Journal, an American Catholic Theological journal.  In 2018 he was assigned to teach at the Angelicum and function as the Director of the Angelicum Thomistic Institute. In June 2021, he was appointed rector of the Angelicum.

On May 13, 2022 White delivered the commencement address at the Catholic University of America and was awarded an Honorary Doctorate of Humane Letters. 

In June 2022 White was appointed president of the Academy of Catholic Theology, one of the principal societies of academic Catholic theology in the United States. 

White is also a founding member of the Roman Catholic bluegrass group, the Hillbilly Thomists, which has released three studio albums, to date.  https://www.nationalreview.com/2022/12/get-religion-and-a-joy-for-life-with-the-hillbilly-thomists/

Bibliography

References

External links 
 Thomas Joseph White on Angelicum Webpage
 Thomas Joseph White on HillBilly Thomists
 Thomas Joseph White on Philpapers

1971 births
21st-century American philosophers
Catholic philosophers
Roman Catholic theologians
Brown University alumni
Alumni of the University of Oxford
Dominican House of Studies alumni
Living people
Metaphysicians
Philosophers of religion
Academic staff of the Pontifical University of Saint Thomas Aquinas
Scholars of medieval philosophy
Thomists